Kazuma Eekman is a Dutch-Japanese contemporary artist with a love for illustration and painting from Rotterdam, the Netherlands. He graduated in 2014 from the Willem de Kooning Academy  and is known for his illustrations in different Dutch newspapers and magazines such as De Volkskrant and het NRC among others. Eekman participated in different group expositions, with the biggest and most recent being UU&ME in the spacious W139 at the Warmoesstraat, in Amsterdam, the Netherlands together with 5 other young artists; initiator Sue van Geijn and, Emile Hermans, Iris Schutgevaar, Diedrik Sibma and Roos Wijma.

References

External links 
Homepage Kazuma Eekman

Dutch artists
Living people
Year of birth missing (living people)
Willem de Kooning Academy alumni
Dutch people of Japanese descent